Bridget Powers (born October 11, 1980) is an American pornographic actress with dwarfism. She is often credited as "Bridget the Midget" or with the alternate spelling "Bridget Powerz". Besides her adult work, she has also appeared in many films in either comedic or dramatic roles, such as Big Money Rustlas, Tiptoes, and S.W.A.T.

Early life
Powers was born in Boise, Idaho. Her parents divorced when she was one year old, and she had a number of operations between the ages of three and fourteen to correct bowed legs; the results left her with one straight leg and one that points to the left. Powers has to wear a knee brace.

Career 
Powers was discovered at a goth nightclub by a man who was working as a make-up artist for a gothic vampire adult movie. She made her first porn film in 1999. By her own count, she appeared in 65 to 70 original films, with compilations bringing that up to over 110. She left the business, as she wished to do condom-only scenes yet many of the male performers would remove the condoms. Disillusioned with the exploitation of the porn film industry, she then set up her own video on demand website.

She was a co-host on Ed Powers' radio show Bedtime Stories. She is also in a band named Blakkout. In addition to her erotic film roles, she has appeared in several mainstream films, such as 8mm, Confessions of a Dangerous Mind, S.W.A.T., Wristcutters: A Love Story, I Hope They Serve Beer in Hell and independent films such as Almost Amateur, Tiptoes, and Lynsey does Jody 2 – Extreme Edition.

She appeared as herself in the 2002 HBO documentary series Cathouse: The Series,  which explored the lives of the owners, management, staff and customers of the Moonlite BunnyRanch brothel in Mound House, Nevada. As "Bridget the Midget", she was featured in an episode of the History Channel series Wild West Tech. In 2006, she appeared on an episode of VH1's celebrity reality show, The Surreal Life. She has also appeared on The Howard Stern Show on E! She also played the role of Tink, Sheriff Sugar Wolf's love interest in the 2010 film Big Money Rustlas.

Personal life
She has one child. On September 18, 2019, she was arrested and booked into the Clark County Detention Center after stabbing her boyfriend Jesse James in the leg at her home in Las Vegas.

Filmography

Film

Television

References

External links
 
 
 

1980 births
Living people
21st-century American women musicians
Actors with dwarfism
Actresses from Idaho
American film actresses
American people of Guatemalan descent
American pornographic film actresses
Hispanic and Latino American people in television
Hispanic and Latino American pornographic film actors
People from Boise, Idaho
Pornographic film actors from Idaho